Maxime Marotte (born 5 December 1986, in Mulhouse) is a French mountain bike racer. He rode at the cross-country event at the 2016 Summer Olympics.

Major results

2004
 3rd  UCI Junior World XCO Championships
2011
 1st  Mixed relay, World Mountain Bike Championships
 1st  Mixed relay, European Mountain Bike Championships
 2nd National XCO Championships
 UCI XCO World Cup
3rd Offenburg
 5th Overall UCI XCO World Cup
2012
 2nd Mixed relay, World Mountain Bike Championships
 3rd National XCO Championships
2013
 2nd Mixed relay, World Mountain Bike Championships
 3rd National XCO Championships
 9th Overall UCI XCO World Cup
2014
 1st  Mixed relay, World Mountain Bike Championships
 1st  Mixed relay, European Mountain Bike Championships
 2nd National XCM Championships
 10th Overall UCI XCO World Cup
3rd Cairns
3rd Pietermaritzburg
2015
 1st  National XCM Championships
 2nd National XCO Championships
 7th Overall UCI Mountain Bike World Cup
2016
 2nd National XCO Championships
 3rd Overall UCI XCO World Cup
2nd Cairns
2nd La Bresse
3rd Albstadt
3rd Lenzerheide
 4th Cross-country, Summer Olympics
2017
 1st  National XCO Championships
 3rd Overall UCI XCO World Cup
2018
 3rd Overall UCI XCO World Cup
3rd Nové Město
3rd Stellenbosch
3rd La Bresse
 3rd National XCO Championships
2020
 UCI XCO World Cup
2nd Nové Město I
2021
 1st  National XCO Championships
 2nd National XCC Championships
2022
 UCI XCO World Cup
2nd Petrópolis
 UCI XCC World Cup
3rd Petrópolis
 Internazionali d’Italia Series
3rd San Zeno di Montagna

References

External links

1986 births
Living people
Sportspeople from Mulhouse
French male cyclists
Cyclists at the 2016 Summer Olympics
Olympic cyclists of France
Université Savoie-Mont Blanc alumni
Cyclists at the 2015 European Games
European Games competitors for France
Cyclists from Grand Est